Hopea ovoidea is a tree in the family Dipterocarpaceae, native to Borneo. The specific epithet ovoidea means "egg-shaped" referring to the flower's ovary.

Description
It has buttresses. The bark is flaky.

Distribution and habitat
Hopea ovoidea is endemic to Borneo, where it is confined to Sabah. A record of the species in Sumatra is unconfirmed.

References

ovoidea
Endemic flora of Borneo
Flora of Sabah
Plants described in 1978
Taxonomy articles created by Polbot